Richard de Drax was Archdeacon of Totnes from 1359 until 1361.

References

Archdeacons of Totnes